Johnny Williams (born 29 December 1982 in Rotherham, Yorkshire) is an English rugby union player for Newcastle Falcons in the Guinness Premiership. Williams' position of choice is as a prop.

External links
Newcastle Falcons profile

1982 births
Living people
Newcastle Falcons players
Rugby union players from Rotherham
21st-century English people